Kandapper Chinniah Kamalasabayson (8 April 1949 – 12 August 2007) was a Sri Lankan Tamil lawyer, Solicitor General of Sri Lanka and Attorney General of Sri Lanka.

Early life and family
Kamalasabayson was born on 8 April 1949 in Trincomalee, eastern Ceylon. He was the son of V. K. Chinniah, a landed proprietor and philanthropist. Kamalasabayson's brother K. C. Kamalanathan was Principal State Counsel in Zambia and Principal Crown Prosecutor in Lesotho. Kamalasabayson was educated at Colombo Hindu Primary School and S. Thomas' College, Mount Lavinia. After school he joined Ceylon Law College, graduating in November 1971 with a first class honours pass. He later received a master's degree in public law from the University of Colombo (1994) and a master's degree in international business law from King's College London (1995).

Kamalasabayson married Ramani. They had a daughter, Vidya.

Career
Kamalasabayson became an advocate of the Supreme Court on 23 June 1972. He worked at the Unofficial Bar in the chambers of G. F. Sethukavalar and E. Balanadarajah  before joining the Attorney-General's Department as an acting State Counsel on 1 August 1974. He was promoted to Senior State Counsel (1983), Deputy Solicitor General (1992) and Additional Solicitor General (1 March 1996). He was made a President's Counsel in 1996. He became Solicitor-General on 1 December 1998 before being promoted to Attorney General on 15 October 1999. He retired on 7 April 2007.

Kamalasabayson was a visiting lecturer at Faculty of Law, University of Colombo, Open University of Sri Lanka and Sri Lanka Law College where he was also an examiner. He was appointed to the Council of Legal Education of Sri Lanka in 1998. He had completed the Legal Advisors' course at the Institute of Advanced Legal Studies, International Contract Negotiation course at the International Law Institute and the Construction Contracts course at the International Development Law Institute. He was appointed to the Monetary Board of Sri Lanka on 18 July 2007.

Kamalasabayson died on 12 August 2007 at Apollo Hospital in Chennai, India.

References

1949 births
2007 deaths
Academic staff of Sri Lanka Law College
Academic staff of the Open University of Sri Lanka
Academic staff of the University of Colombo
Alumni of Ceylon Law College
Alumni of Colombo Hindu College
Alumni of King's College London
Alumni of S. Thomas' College, Mount Lavinia
Alumni of the University of Colombo
Attorneys General of Sri Lanka
Ceylonese advocates
People from Trincomalee
President's Counsels (Sri Lanka)
Solicitors General of Sri Lanka
Sri Lankan Tamil academics
Sri Lankan Tamil lawyers